Engelthal Abbey or St. Mary's Abbey, Engelthal, is a Benedictine nunnery in the Wetterau region, Hesse, Germany.

Engelthal Abbey was a Cistercian nunnery from its foundation in 1268, until the secularisation of 1803. It was ruled by Imperial Counts of Leiningen-Westerburg-Neuleiningen and later in 19th century sold to Counts of Solms-Wildenfels.

In 1962 it was re-settled by the Benedictine nuns of Herstelle Abbey. The house was raised to the status of abbey in 1965, and belongs to the Beuronese Congregation of the Benedictine Confederation.

Besides the normal Benedictine duty of hospitality, the nuns of Engelthal are also involved in the restoration of ecclesiastical works of art.

Sources and external links
 Abbey Website 

Cistercian nunneries in Germany
Monasteries in Hesse
1260s establishments in the Holy Roman Empire
1268 establishments in Europe
Religious organizations established in the 1260s
Benedictine nunneries in Germany